A laundry room (also called a utility room) is a room where clothes are washed and dried.  In a modern home, a laundry room would be equipped with an automatic washing machine and clothes dryer, and often a large basin, called a laundry tub, for hand-washing delicate articles of clothing such as sweaters, and an ironing board. A typical laundry room is located in the basement of older homes, but in many modern homes, the laundry room might be found on the main floor near the kitchen or upstairs near the bedrooms.

Another typical location is adjacent to the garage and the laundry room serves as a mudroom for the entrance from the garage.  As the garage is often at a different elevation (or grade) from the rest of the house, the laundry room that serves as an entrance from the garage that may be sunken from the rest of the house.  This prevents or reduces the need for stairs between the garage and the house.

Laundry rooms may also include storage cabinets, countertops for folding clothes, and, space permitting, a small sewing machine.

Most houses in the United Kingdom do not have laundry rooms; as such, the washing machine and dryer are usually located in the kitchen or garage.

In Hungary, some older apartment buildings and most workers' hostels have communal laundry rooms, called mosókonyha (lit. "washing kitchen") in Hungarian. In the former, when residents started to all own individual washing machines in their apartments, obsoleted laundry rooms were sometimes converted into small apartments, shops or workshops (e.g. a shoemaker's) or used simply for storage.

See also
 Scullery (room), a room used for washing up dishes and laundering clothes, or as an overflow kitchen
 Lavoir, a public place for the washing of clothes

References

External links

Rooms
Laundry places